Narlıdere can refer to:

 Narlıdere
 Narlıdere, Bitlis
 Narlıdere, Kestel